District F of the Texas Senate is an obsolete Senate District. Though probably not known by the name District F, it was a "floating" senatorial district that served Bowie, Red River, Fannin, and Lamar counties. It was only active for the First and Second Texas Legislatures.

District officeholders

F
Bowie County, Texas
Fannin County, Texas
Lamar County, Texas
Red River County, Texas